"Ego Trippin' (Part Two)" is a 1994 single by American hip hop group De La Soul, and the second single to be released from the group's 1993 album Buhloone Mindstate.

The song utilizes music samples taken from the songs of other artists including Al Hirt's track "Harlem Hendoo" from his 1967 album entitled Soul in the Horn.

Track listing
"Ego Trippin' (Part Two) (Original Version)" – 3:52 (Produced by De La Soul & Prince Paul)
"Ego Trippin' (Part Two) (LA Jay Remix)" – 4:13 (Remixed by LA Jay & Royme)
"Ego Trippin' (Part Two) (Original Instrumental)" – 3:52 (Produced by De La Soul & Prince Paul)
"Ego Trippin' (Part Three) (Egoristic Mix)" – 4:42 (Remixed by Spearhead X, Co-Remixed by The Beat Messiahs)
"Ego Trippin' (Part Two) (Gumbo Funk Remix)" – 5:46 (Remixed by N.O. Joe)
"Lovely How I Let My Mind Float" – 4:02 (Produced by De La Soul & Prince Paul)
Guest Appearance: Biz Markie
"Ego Trippin' (Part Three) (Egoristic Instrumental)" – 4:40 (Remixed by Spearhead X, Co-Remixed by The Beat Messiahs)

Charts

References

1994 singles
De La Soul songs
Tommy Boy Records singles
1993 songs
Songs written by David Jude Jolicoeur
Songs written by Vincent Mason
Songs written by Kelvin Mercer
Songs written by Prince Paul (producer)